This is a list of women artists who were born in Iraq or whose artworks are closely associated with that country.

A
Najiba Ahmad (born 1954), poet
Kajal Ahmad (born 1967 Kirkuk), Kurdish-Iraqi poet
Firyal Al-Adhamy (born 1950), painter
Reem Alasadi (active since 2000), fashion designer
Rheim Alkadhi (born 1973), interdisciplinary artist
Jananne Al-Ani (born 1966), artist, photographer, filmmaker, researcher
Layla Al-Attar (fl. 1965–1993), painter
Sama Alshaibi (born 1973), contemporary artist 
Halla Ayla (born 1957), photographer, painter

C
Wasma'a Khalid Chorbachi (born 1944), Iraqi-American ceramist, calligrapher, painter

E

Enheduanna, poet 23rd century BC, thought to be the earliest poet

F
Lisa Fattah (1941–1992), German-Iraqi painter, married to influential sculptor, Ismail Fatah Al Turk

H
Zaha Hadid (1950–2016), Iraqi-British architect
 Wihad al-Halem

J
 Najar al-Jader
 Ishtar Jamil
  Haky Jasim (born 1958 Baghdad)

K
Hayv Kahraman (born 1981), painter and sculptor
Toba Khedoori (born 1964), Iraqi-Australian mixed-media artist (twin sister of Rachel Khedoori)
Rachel Khedoori (born 1964), Iraqi-Australian artist (twin sister of Toba Khedoori)

M
Hanaa Malallah (born 1958), Iraqi mixed-media artist

O
 Madiha Omar (1908–2005), pioneer of Hurufiyya movement

R
Nuha al-Radi (born 1941), diarist, ceramist, painter

S
Hana Sadiq (active since 1980s), fashion designer
Salima Salih (born 1942), short story writer, translator and artist
Naziha Salim (1927–2008), painter, sculptor
Tamara Salman (active since 2004), fashion designer
Maheen al-Sarraf 
Sihan al-Saudi 
Lorna Selim (1928–2012), British-Iraqi painter, wife of Jawad Saleem influential Iraqi sculptor
Vian Sora (born 1976), Iraqi-American painter

T
Aatqall Taúaa (active since 1970s), digital artist

Z
Zeena Zaki (born 1974), fashion designer
Haifa Zangana (born 1950), writer, artist, political activist

See also
 Iraqi art
 List of Iraqi artists

References

-
Iraqi women artists, List of
Artists, List of Iraqi
Artists